The European Year of Equal Opportunities for All was held in 2007. This designation was made on 31 May 2005 by the European Commission's Directorate-General for Employment, Social Affairs and Equal Opportunities. It was part of a concerted effort to promote equality and non-discrimination in the European Union.

Main working themes 
The four core themes of the European Year proposed by the European Commission were:
 Rights – raising awareness of the right to equality and non-discrimination
 Representation – stimulating a debate on ways to increase the participation of under-represented groups in society
 Recognition – celebrating and accommodating diversity
 Respect and tolerance – promoting a more cohesive society

Official Translations 
 in Dutch (Nederlands): 'Europees Jaar voor Gelijke Kansen voor Iedereen' (NL)
 in German (Deutsch): 'Europäisches Jahr der Chancengleichheit' (DE)

External links
Official Site
EU - Action against Discrimination
Press Release announcing year

Equal opportunities for all
2007 in the European Union
Equal employment opportunity